The R32 was a New York City Subway car model built by the Budd Company from 1964 to 1965 for the IND/BMT B Division. A total of 600 R32s were built, numbered 3350–3949, though some cars were re-numbered. The R32 contract was divided into two subcontracts of 300 cars each: R32 (cars 3350–3649) and R32A (cars 3650–3949); the former was paid by the city's capital budget and the latter was paid through a revenue bond. All were arranged as married pairs. 

The R32s were the first mass-produced stainless steel cars built for the New York City Subway. A ceremonial introduction trip for the new R32 "Brightliners" cars was held on September 9, 1964. Various modifications were made over the years to the R32 fleet. In the late 1980s, all of the R32 cars were rebuilt, with ten cars being rebuilt by General Electric and the remaining cars being rebuilt by Morrison–Knudsen. As part of the refurbishment, the original rollsigns and express/local marker lights at the end of each car were replaced with flipdot signs. After refurbishment, the R32 and R32A cars were renamed R32 Phase I, R32 Phase II, and R32 GE.

The R160s replaced most of the R32s in the late 2000s, though about one-third of the original fleet remained, all being Phase I R32s. The rest were initially retired in early 2020 and replaced with the R179s. Due to the R179s being pulled from service, they returned to service in summer 2020 and ran until being retired again in early October 2020 after investigations of the R179 cars were completed and they returned to service. A series of farewell trips with the final train of R32s running in passenger service began on December 19, 2021 and concluded on January 9, 2022. After retirement, most of the R32s were scrapped, sunk as artificial reefs, or placed into storage, but some have been preserved, and others retained for various purposes.

Description
The R32s were numbered 3350–3949, although some cars were re-numbered outside of this range or to different numbers in this range. They were the first cars to introduce all-mylar route and destination rollsigns instead of the former cotton cloth or linen type rollsigns found on prior rail cars.

The R32 contract was divided into two subcontracts of 300 cars each: R32 (cars 3350–3649) and R32A (cars 3650–3949). The R32As were funded through the proceeds of a revenue bond, while the R32s were paid for out of the 1963–1964 New York City capital budget. The two subcontracts differed with the first 150 R32s having visible bulkhead horns – the last cars to be built with this feature – on R32 cars 3350–3499. This feature can also be found on the Redbirds, R27s, and R30s, along with various older trains. Another distinctive difference was the interior lighting featuring backlit ad-signs on R32A cars 3800–3949.

The R32s were the first mass-produced stainless steel cars built for the New York City Subway. Two previous Budd orders (the BMT Zephyr and the R11s) were limited production and/or experimental orders. The horizontally ribbed, shiny, and unpainted stainless exteriors earned the cars the nickname Brightliners. The use of stainless steel reduced the weight of each car by over 4,000 pounds, when compared to previous models.

History

In June 1963, the New York City Transit Authority contracted with Budd for 600 IND/BMT cars (300 pairs) to replace older equipment (cars that had exceeded the TA's 35-year limit of age), including the BMT D-type Triplex articulated cars and some of the BMT Standards. At the time, this was the largest railcar order ever placed in the United States for subway cars.

The cars were ordered for $68,820,000, of which half was provided by New York City and half through the sale of bonds by the New York City Transit Authority. Budd had bid on previous contracts with the NYCTA, but had never won a City contract for a production run of cars until the R32s, as Budd built only stainless-steel equipment, and the TA refused to allow a differential in competitive bids for this higher-quality construction.

Budd won the contract by offering the lowest bid of $114,700 per car. The next lowest bidder came in at $117,900 per car, which was for low-alloy steel cars. Budd introduced stainless steel equipment to the modern New York City Subway system, a plan that was met with limited success. NYCTA allowed a premium for subsequent stainless steel contracts, and all subsequent equipment was at least partly constructed of stainless steel. However, the Budd Company never benefited from the change, as they failed to win further contracts from the NYCTA, and the company has since halted the production of railroad cars.

The R32 cars originally came with blue passenger doors and blue storm doors. The passenger doors of many cars were repainted silver from 1974, as the graffiti epidemic worsened. Some cars retained or regained blue passenger doors towards the start of the General Overhaul (GOH) program, which replaced all the doors with stainless steel versions.

On August 18, 1964, the NYCTA approved a modification to the 300 R32s already constructed. The modification was required to ensure proper clearance in tunnels. Since the cars were 4,000 pounds lighter than other subway cars when new, they did not sink as low on standard trucks and springs. The modification involved the modification of the body bolster.

A ceremonial introduction trip for the new R32 "Brightliners" cars was held on September 9, 1964, operating from the New York Central Railroad's Mott Haven Yards in the Bronx to Grand Central Terminal in Midtown Manhattan. The R32s were originally assigned to the BMT Southern Division service only, initially on the Brighton Line (Q train) and the Sea Beach Line ( train), but were eventually reassigned to the West End Line ( and TT trains).

Cars 3946–3949 were delivered with Pioneer trucks and disc brakes in 1966. These trucks were replaced with standard trucks in 1976.

In 1974, cars 3700–3701 were sent to Garrett AiResearch's facilities in Los Angeles, California, to test out Flywheel energy storage system equipment. 3700 received energy conservation machinery with batteries and amber-type digital readout indicating the amount of energy used by the equipment, while 3701 remained unmodified. These cars were later tested at the UMTA, and the US Department of Transportation's Testing Facilities in Pueblo, Colorado, for evaluation, and were returned to the MTA in 1976 for in-service testing on all BMT/IND Lines to check the effectiveness of the technology.

Overhaul and mishaps
Cars 3616, 3629, 3651, and 3766 were scrapped due to collision damage sustained in various accidents in the 1970s and 1980s. Their mates were paired with other cars. 

Car 3659 was rebuilt as an even-numbered car and renumbered to 3348 following the loss of its even-numbered mate in an accident. Car 3669 was retired following a derailment, so its even-numbered mate 3668 was rebuilt into an odd-numbered car and renumbered to 3669.

From 1988 to 1990, as part of the NYCTA General Overhaul (GOH) program, the R32 cars were rebuilt. Ten cars were rebuilt by General Electric at its facility in Buffalo, New York (cars 3594–3595, 3880–3881, 3892–3893, 3936–3937, and 3934–3935) as prototype rebuilds, and the remaining cars were rebuilt by Morrison–Knudsen at its facility in Hornell, New York. During the rebuilding process, the route and destination mylar rollsigns located above the storm doors were removed and replaced with Luminator flipdot electronic route signs that can display both letters and numbers, including zero to nine. This is because the air conditioning evaporators mounted on the interior car ends made it difficult to change the front route and destination signs. The distinctive "EXP" (express) and "LOCAL" marker lights were removed. The rollsigns on the sides of the cars were updated and retained.

After refurbishment, the R32 and R32A cars were renamed R32 Phase I, R32 Phase II, and R32 GE. The R32 Phase I cars (re-built by Morrison–Knudsen) had WABCO Air Brake packages, GE Master Controllers, and Thermo King HVAC units. The R32 Phase II cars (also re-built by Morrison–Knudsen) had NY Air Brake equipment, Westinghouse Master Controllers, and Stone Safety HVAC units. The ten prototype rebuild R32 GE cars differ from the Phase I and II cars as they were rebuilt to R38 specifications. They had experimental Sigma HVAC Units powered by A/C motors and solid state inverters, original traction motors rebuilt to 115 horsepower instead of the traditional 100 horsepower units, backlit ad signs, and different bulkhead designs. Since the cars were sent out to be overhauled based on how poorly they were performing (worst first), there were R32s and R32As rebuilt in both Phase I and Phase II configurations. There were about a dozen or more pairs that are composed of R32 and R32A mixes.

Retirement

The R160s replaced most of the R32s in the late 2000s.  The ten GE cars were retired first in the summer of 2007. The Phase II R32s followed a year later, from March 2008 until October 13, 2008. A handful of Phase I R32s were retired from early 2009 until November 2009, when it was decided to retire the NYCT R44s instead. By December 2010, only 232 active cars remained, 222 of which were assigned to 207th Street Yard, operating on the A and C. These had periodically underwent intermittent SMS (Scheduled Maintenance Service, a life-extension program) cycles – at a cost of $25 million – to extend their useful lives. 

The R179s replaced the remainder of the R32s in the early 2020s. The cars were originally slated for retirement in 2017, but the R179s experienced delays in delivery. Subsequently, plans were changed to retain the R32s in order for them to provide a backup fleet and support service increased frequencies until in 2022, when they would finally be replaced by the R211s. By January 2020, it was again decided to retire the R32s with the R179s. 

With the R179 delivery completed, the R32s were gradually phased out until the last train made its final trip on the C on March 26, 2020. In June 2020, some cars were reactivated and transferred to East New York Yard to provide backup revenue service due to the R179s being pulled from service. The R32s re-entered service on the J and Z on July 1, 2020 and remained in service until being withdrawn again on October 8, 2020.

After a year in storage, the R32s were officially retired when the last train made final runs in December 2021 and January 2022 as part of a series of farewell trips organized by the New York Transit Museum on four consecutive Sundays. On December 19 and 26, 2021, and January 2, 2022, the train ran along the IND Sixth Avenue Line between Second Avenue and 145th Street. On January 9, 2022, the train ran along the IND Second Avenue Line, BMT Broadway Line, and BMT Brighton Line between 96th Street and Brighton Beach.

Most cars retired by the R160s were stripped and sunk as artificial reefs. After the reefing program ended in April 2010, cars retired by the R160s were trucked to Sims Metal Management's Newark facility to be scrapped and processed. The scrapping and processing of these cars occurred between April 2013 and October 2013. Many of the cars retired by the R179s were towed through the South Brooklyn Railway, New York New Jersey Rail, and the Brooklyn Army Terminal before being partially disassembled for shipment to Frontier Industrial Corp in Ohio starting in February 2022.

Some R32 cars were saved for various purposes, as following:
 Phase II pair 3350–3351 – set aside for preservation by the Railway Preservation Corp.
 Phase II pair 3352–3353 – set aside for preservation by the New York Transit Museum. This pair was the lead pair on the R32s' premiere trip on September 9, 1964.

 GE-rebuilt pair 3594–3595 – being used as NYPD training cars at Floyd Bennett Field.

Several cars taken out of revenue service were used for work service, handling such tasks as providing traction for B Division rail adhesion cars and refuse trains. They were eventually replaced by fifty R42 cars between 2020 and 2022.

Longevity
The longest-lasting R32s were in service for almost 58 years, currently the longest such service life in New York City rapid transit operations. They were the last cars built for the New York City Transit Authority – prior to its merger with the Metropolitan Transportation Authority in 1968 – to remain in service. The R32s had survived well past their specified service life of 35 years. They are the oldest rolling stock since the retirement of the Redbird trains, and the oldest rolling stock of any metro system in North America, as well as some of the oldest rolling stock of any metro system anywhere in the world. The R32s outlasted the newer R38s, R40s, R42s, and New York City Transit R44s. According to railfan James Greller, they are often cited for their superior durability and craftsmanship, along with the structural reinforcement done to their bodies during the GOH period.

Despite their considerable structural quality, the R32s suffered from low mechanical reliability near the end of their service lives. They had the lowest Mean Distance Between Failures figures of the active fleet, as the overhauls they received during the 1988–89 period wore out after 29–30 years. Others criticized the R32s for their appearance and lack of comfort. In August 2011, The New York Times called the R32s "a dreary reminder to passengers of an earlier subterranean era", and claimed that "time has taken a toll" on the cars. The cars had worn-out air conditioning, propulsion, and braking systems, so they were often temporarily transferred to services with mostly outdoor or elevated portions, namely the A, J, and Z.

In popular culture 

In the famous car chase scene in the film The French Connection, the chased train of R42s crashes into an R32.

An R32 is featured in Men in Black II, featuring an alien entering a tunnel. Once there, it attacks and devours most of a subway train (which is a combination of R32 and R38 cars) until Agent J destroys it. He is then seen walking out of the station, 81st Street – Museum of Natural History.

An R32 is featured in Inside Llewyn Davis, but however, the train is historically inaccurate.

A train of R32s was featured in the 2015 film Bridge of Spies, although the film is set a decade prior to their manufacturing. They were the oldest available rolling stock to form a realistic 10-car train for exterior filming. Interior shots were done with a more period-appropriate R11/R34 from the New York Transit Museum.

Several trains of R32s were featured in the movie Spider-Man: Homecoming, on the  train.

An R32 is featured at Church Avenue station, 18th Avenue station, and Bedford Park Boulevard station for the movie Joker.

An R32 is featured in the second season of Russian Doll.

Notes

References

Further reading
 Sansone, Gene. Evolution of New York City subways: An illustrated history of New York City's transit cars, 1867–1997. New York Transit Museum Press, New York, 1997

External links

nycsubway.org - NYC Subway Cars: R32

New York City Subway rolling stock
Budd multiple units
Train-related introductions in 1964